Tom Heard (born 24 August 1993) is an English professional rugby union player who plays for Plymouth Albion.
A product of Gloucester academy. He signed his first professional contract with Plymouth Albion who play in the RFU Championship. On 4 November 2015, Heard signed for Championship rivals Nottingham from the 2015-16 season. On 13 June 2017, Heard returns to home club in Gloucestershire Hartpury RFC from the 2017-18 season.

References

1993 births
Living people
English rugby union players
Gloucester Rugby players
Rugby union players from Taunton
Sportspeople from Gloucestershire
Rugby union props